Thomas Attewell (7 November 1869 – 6 July 1937) was an English first-class cricketer.  Attewell was a right-handed batsman who bowled right-arm medium pace.  He was born at Keyworth, Nottinghamshire.

Attewell made his first-class debut for Nottinghamshire against the Marylebone Cricket Club in 1891.  That same season he made his County Championship debut against Gloucestershire.  From 1891 to 1894, he represented the county in 7 first-class matches, the last of which came against Gloucestershire. In his 7 first-class matches, he scored 53 runs at a batting average of 7.57, with a high score of 23*.  In the field he took 2 catches.

Later, Attewell also stood as an umpire in first-class and Minor Counties Championship matches.

He died at Nottingham on 6 July 1937.

Family
His brother William played first-class cricket for Nottinghamshire and the Marylebone Cricket Club, as well as Test cricket for England.  His cousin Walter Attewell played first-class cricket for Nottinghamshire.

References

External links
Thomas Attewell at Cricinfo
Thomas Attewell at CricketArchive

1869 births
1937 deaths
People from Keyworth
Cricketers from Nottinghamshire
English cricketers
Nottinghamshire cricketers
English cricket umpires